Mississippi Highway 310 (MS 310) is a  east-west state highway in northern Mississippi. It runs from MS 3 in Crenshaw to MS 7 in the unincorporated area of Malone.

Route description

MS 310 begins on the eastern edge of the Mississippi Delta region in Panola County at an intersection with MS 3 in the very center of downtown Crenshaw. It immediately leaves downtown and passes through some neighborhoods before leaving the town to climb up some Loess bluff to leave the Delta. It travels eastward through a mix of woodlands and flat farmland for the next several miles, passing through the community of Longtown, to enter the town of Como at an intersection with U.S. Route 51 (US 51). The passes through some as it traverses the southern end of downtown, where it crosses a railroad track, before leaving Como at an interchange with Interstate 55 (I-55) at exit 257. MS 310 travels through more flat farmland for several more miles before entering the North Central Hills region, where it winds its way northeast through rugged, wooded, and hilly terrain as it travels along the northern coastline of Sardis Lake. It crosses into Lafayette County after a few miles.

MS 310 continues traveling northeast to pass through the communities of Harmontown and Blackwater (where it crosses Blackwater Creek) before entering into neighboring Marshall County. It passes through the community of Laws Hill, where the highway curves more eastward, before passing through more hilly woodlands to come to an end at an intersection with MS 7.

The entire length of Mississippi Highway 310 is a rural, two-lane, state highway for its entire length.

Major intersections

See also

References

External links

310
Transportation in Marshall County, Mississippi
Transportation in Lafayette County, Mississippi
Transportation in Panola County, Mississippi